Saint-Quentin is a city in the Aisne department, Hauts-de-France, northern France. It has been identified as the Augusta Veromanduorum of antiquity.  It is named after Saint Quentin of Amiens, who is said to have been martyred there in the 3rd century.

Administration
Saint-Quentin is a sub-prefecture of Aisne. Although Saint-Quentin is by far the largest city in Aisne, the capital is the third-largest city, Laon.

Mayors
The mayor of Saint-Quentin is Frédérique Macarez, a member of the centre-right LR Party.

History
The city was founded by the Romans, in the Augustean period, to replace the oppidum of Vermand (11 km away) as the capital of Viromandui (Celtic Belgian people who occupied the region). It received the name  "Augusta Viromanduorum", Augusta of the Viromandui, in honor of the emperor Augustus. The site is that of a ford across the River Somme. During the late Roman period, it is possible that the civitas capital was transferred back to Vermand (whose name comes from Veromandis); almost nothing relating to the fourth century has been found in Saint-Quentin.

During the early Middle Ages, a major monastery, now the Basilica of Saint-Quentin, developed, based on pilgrimage to the tomb of Quentin, a Roman Christian who came to evangelize the region and was martyred in Augusta, giving rise to a new town which was named after him.

From the 9th century, Saint-Quentin was the capital of Vermandois County. From the 10th century, the counts of Vermandois (descendants of the Carolingian, then Capetian families) were very powerful. The city grew rapidly: the "bourgeois" organized themselves and obtained, in the second half of the 12th century (a very early date), a municipal charter, which guaranteed their commune a large degree of autonomy.

At the beginning of the 13th century, Saint-Quentin entered the royal domain. At that time, it was a thriving city, based on its wool textile industry (city “drapante”). It was also a centre of commerce boosted by its position on the border of the kingdom of France, between the Champagne fairs and the cities of Flanders (wine exportation, etc.): it had an important annual fair. It also benefited from its location in the heart of a rich agricultural region (trade of grain and “guède” (woad), a high-value blue dye).

From the 14th century, Saint-Quentin suffered from this strategic position: it endured the French-English wars (Hundred Years' War). In the 15th century, the city was disputed between the king of France and the dukes of Burgundy (it is one of the "cities of the Somme"). Ravaged by the plague on several occasions, its population decreased, while its economy was in crisis: its fair was increasingly irrelevant, and agricultural production diminished. The declining textile industry turned to the production of linen canvas. Meanwhile, the city faced major expenses to maintain its fortifications and armed troops.

Between the end of the 15th century and the mid-17th century, this strategic position was the cause of frequent misfortune. In 1557, a siege by the Spanish army (as part of the battle of Saint-Quentin) ended with the looting of the city and its desertion for two years. Given back to France in 1559, it underwent intense fortification work: the medieval wall, redesigned several times, was protected by many new advanced fortifications. Two districts were razed to make way for them. In the mid-17th century, the city escaped the sieges, but suffered the horrors of wars ravaging the Picardy region, accompanied by the plague (in 1636, 3,000 people died, out of perhaps 10,000 inhabitants) and famine.

In the second half of the 17th century, the conquests of Louis XIV moved the border away from Saint- Quentin, and it lost much of its strategic role. At the end of the 16th century, its textile production specialized in fine flax canvas (batiste and lawn). This brought prosperity, particularly in the 18th century, when these textiles were exported across Europe and the Americas.

During the First French Empire, difficulties in the export market brought economic decline. At the request of the municipality, Napoleon ordered the razing of the fortifications, to allow the city to grow beyond its old boundaries. In 1814-1815, Saint-Quentin was occupied by the Russian army, but without any damage.

In the 19th century, Saint-Quentin developed into a thriving industrial city, thanks to entrepreneurs constantly on the lookout for new technologies. Textiles and mechanical devices were foremost among a wide variety of products.

In 1870, during the Franco-Prussian War, the population repelled the Prussians on October 8, but the city fell during the second offensive. The hopeless but heroic action had national repercussions: Saint-Quentin was decorated with the Legion of Honour. In 1871, on January 19, the French army was defeated near the town.

The First World War hit Saint-Quentin very hard. In September 1914, the city was overrun; it endured a harsh occupation. From 1916, it lay at the heart of the war zone, because the Germans had integrated it into the Hindenburg Line. After the evacuation of the population in March, the town was systematically looted and industrial equipment removed or destroyed. The fighting destroyed it: 80% of buildings (including the Basilica of Saint-Quentin) were damaged.

Despite national support, the reconstruction process was long, and the city struggled to regain its pre-1914 dynamism. The 1911 population of 55,000 was achieved again only in the mid-1950s, in the context of general economic expansion. This prosperity continued until the mid-1970s, when the French textile industry began to suffer through competition from developing countries.

Climate

Population

Culture

Monuments
Basilica of Saint-Quentin, built in the 12th-15th century. Heavily damaged in World War I, the vaults, windows and roofs have been restored.
Hôtel de ville (city hall), built between 1331 and 1509 in a gothic style. L'hôtel de ville of Saint-Quentin is famous for its peal of 37 bells. It was modified in the 19th century and heavily restored in 1926 in Art Déco style.
The municipal theatre Jean-Vilar, built in 1844.
The city has several beguinages, dating from the Middle-Age. 
The Fervaques palace: was built between 1897 and 1911, it is the place of High court.
The Porte des Canonniers, a 17th century city gate

Museums
 Butterflies' Museum which has a collection of more than 600,000 insects, displaying 20,000 of them
 Antoine Lecuyer Museum which owns the largest collection of Maurice Quentin de La Tour's pastels
 Academic Society, archaeologic museum Société Académique de Saint-Quentin

Transport
The Gare de Saint-Quentin is the railway station, offering connections to Paris, Reims, Amiens, Lille and several regional destinations. The A26 motorway connects Saint-Quentin with Reims and Calais, the A29 with Amiens.

Personalities
 Alexis Yetna, basketball player
 Viviane Adjutor, basketball player
 Anthony Benezet, American Abolitionist
 Dudo of Saint-Quentin (born ca. 965), historian
 Charles de Bouelles (1479–1567), philosopher, mathematician and linguist
 Quentin-Claude Bendier (died 1677), scholar and bibliophile
 William Cliff, inventor of machine-woven tulle
 Marc Delmas (1885–1931), Expressionist composer and biographer
Jeanne-Marie de Maille (1331-1414), saint
 Antoine Francisque (c.1570–1605), lutenist and composer
 Jules Gallay (1822–1897), lawyer and music historian
 Rudy Gobert (born 1992), professional basketball player for the Minnesota Timberwolves of the NBA; 3x Defensive Player of the Year
 Kafetien Gomis (born 1980), athlete
 Étienne Mendy (born 1969), footballer
 Jean Louis Marie Poiret (1755–1834), botanist and explorer
 François-Noël Babeuf (1760–1797), known as Gracchus Babeuf, political agitator and journalist of the revolutionary period
 Charles Rogier (1800–1885), Belgian statesman
 Félix Davin (1807–1836), French poet and journalist
 Jean Leune (1889 - 1944), war correspondent, writer, military officer, and member of the French Resistance.
 Andre Trocme pacifist Protestant church leader.
 Yves Velan (1925-2017), Swiss writer
 Jean-Marie Lefèvre (born 1953), modernist and minimalist poet
 Xavier Bertrand (born 1965), former Minister of Labour, Social Relations, Family and Solidarity in François Fillon's second government, conservative
 Édouard Lucien Briquet (1854-1905) (engineer, left Paris under siege, going to work on the construction of the Trans-Saharan Railroad, in the 1870s. He moved to Brazil in 1883, working on several railroads in the interior of the country.

Artists
 Mathieu (de) Bléville, born in Saint-Quentin at the beginning of the 16th century, painter on glass (vitraux).
 Pierre Berton (16th century), « Pierre de Saint-Quentin », stonecutter.
 Ulysse Butin (1838–1883), painter.
 John Cross, (1819-1861), English painter who studied at the Saint-Quentin School of Design
 Benoît Delépine (1958-), scriptwriter, actor.
 Michel Dorigny (1617–1665), painter and printmaker, professor at Painting Academy of Paris.
 Delphine Gleize (1973-), film director.
 Paul Guiramand, (1926–2007), painter and winner of the grand prix de Rome in 1953.
 Édouard Hippolyte Margottet (1848–1887), painter.
 Arthur Midy (1887–1944), painter.
 Amédée Ozenfant (1886–1966), leader of Purism, an avant-garde movement of the 1920s.
 Jean-Christophe Paré, (1957-) dancer and teacher.
 Julie-Marie Parmentier (1981-), actress.
 Maurice Pillard dit Verneuil, (born in 29 avril 1869 - died in 1942, Genève), well-known illustrator of Art nouveau.
 Maurice Quentin de La Tour (1704–1788), pastellist, he became famous by his portrait, portrait painter official of Louis XV, benefactor of the city (foundation of School of design Maurice Quentin de La Tour).

French sartorial heritage 
The city was a pivotal centre of mulquinerie.

Incidents 
On March 30th 2013, five children, between the ages of two and ten, were killed in a house fire in the city. 

Their parents had recently separated and their father was hosting the children at his new home for the first time for the weekend, as they had been spending most of their time with their mother. At 10:30pm local time on March 30th, the fire started via an unknown cause. The childrens’ father, alongside neighbours, made desperate attempts to save the children, but by the time the emergency services arrived, it was too late. The building was considered “too dangerous to enter” and the bodies of the five children were discovered once the fire was extinguished.

The childrens’ father was seriously burned in a failed attempt to save his childrens’ lives and jumped through a window to safety. He was hospitalised and wasn’t informed until later on Sunday that his children had passed away.

Twin towns - sister cities

Saint-Quentin is twinned with:
 Kaiserslautern, Germany
 Rotherham, Yorkshire, England
 San Lorenzo de El Escorial, Spain
 Tongzhou (Beijing), China

See also
 Battle of St. Quentin (disambiguation)
 Communes of the Aisne department
 Augusta Viromanduorum

Gallery

References

External links

 Official website 
 Official website of Saint-Quentin tourism office 
 Historical footage of Saint-Quentin in World War I, europeanfilmgateway.eu

Communes of Aisne
Subprefectures in France
Viromandui